Emrullah Küçükbay is a Turkish former footballer. He competed in the men's tournament at the 1960 Summer Olympics.

References

External links
 
 

Year of birth missing (living people)
Living people
Turkish footballers
Olympic footballers of Turkey
Footballers at the 1960 Summer Olympics
Place of birth missing (living people)
Association football goalkeepers
Eskişehirspor footballers